The Crozet scad (Trachurus longimanus) is a species of jack mackerel from the family Carangidae, the jacks, pompanos and trevallies, which is found off oceanic islands and over banks and sea mountains in the south east Atlantic and south western Indian Oceans.

References

Crozet scad
Taxa named by John Roxborough Norman
Fish described in 1935